Rokk í Reykjavík was the soundtrack to the Icelandic TV documentary directed by Friðrik Þór Friðriksson during 1981-82 winter and released in 1982.
The soundtrack, which was released in April 1982 as a 2 LP released through Hugrenningur, features the performances of several Icelandic bands of the post-punk/new wave scene.
Bands such as Þeyr, Tappi Tíkarrass (a band led by singer Björk), Purrkur Pillnikk (with Einar Örn Benediktsson as the front-man), among others, were considered some of the most important bands at the moment. The image cover for this release is a picture of singer Björk performing with Tappi Tíkarrass.
The record sold over 2000 copies. Ira Robbins from Trouser Press stated that the album is a good compilation album to get to know Icelandic music.

Reissue
October 1993 - Rokk í Reykjavík. Label: Bad Taste. Catalogue number: SME2.

LP 1
Side A - length: 17:12
Side B - length: 20:37
Total length: 37:49

Track listing

LP 2
Side C - length: 18:35
Side D - length: 20:34
Total length: 39:09

Track listing

Credits

Personnel
Recording engineers from studio Þursabit: Júlíus Agnarsson, Tómas Magnús Tómasson, Þórður Árnason.
Sound: Jón Karl Helgason.
Executive board: Þorgeir Gunnarsson.
Mixing: Alan Snelling, Þórður Árnason.
Sound production: Anvil Studios, Abber Road, London.
Vinyl master cutting and vinyl pressing: Mayking Records, London.
Film processing and lithography: Prentsmiðjan Oddi.
Album design: Árni Páll Jóhansson.
Distribution: Steinar.
Tracks recorded on an 8-track Dolby-Stereo recorder.

Artists
Sveinbjörn Beinteinsson
Concert place: Menntaskólinn í Hamrahlið.
Vonbrigði: Jóhann Vilhjámsson - vocals. Gunnar Ellertsson - bass. Árni Kristjánsson - guitar. Þórarinn Kristjánsson - drums.
Concert place: Hafnarbíó.
Friðryk: Pétur Hjaltested - vocals, keyboards. Pálmi Gunnarsson - bass, vocals. Tryggvi J. Hübner - guitar. Sigurður Karlsson - drums. Björgvin Gíslason - guitar.
Concert place: Top of the Rock, U.S. NATO Base, Keflavík.
Egó: Asbjörn Morthens - vocals. Bergþór Morthens - guitar. Þorleifur Guðjónsson - bass. Ragnar Sigurðsson - guitar. Magnús Stefánsson - drums.
Concert place: Hótel Borg and Æfingahúsnæði.
Start: Pétur W. Kristjánsson - vocals. Eiríkur Hauksson - vocals, guitar. Nikulás Róbertsson - keyboards. Jón Ólafsson - bass. Davíð Karlsson - drums. Kristján Edelstein - guitar.
Concert place: Broadway.
Tappi Tíkarrass: Björk Guðmundsdóttir - vocals. Eyþór Arnalds - vocals. Eyjólfur Jóhannsson - guitar. Jakob Smári Magnússon - bass. Oddur F. Sigurbjörnsson - drums.
Concert place: Ársel Community Centre.

Þursaflokkurinn: Egill Ólafsson - keyboards, vocals. Þórður Árnason - guitar. Tómas Magnús Tómasson - bass. Ásgeir Óskarsson - drums. Júlíus Agnarsson - Mix.
Concert place:Studío Grettisgat.
Baraflokkurinn: Ásgeir Jónsson - vocals. Þór Freysson - guitar. Jón Arnar Freysson - keyboards. Baldvin H. Sigurðsson - bass. Árni Henriksen - drums.
Concert place: Hótel Borg.
Purrkur Pillnikk: Einar Örn Benediktsson - vocals. Bragi Ólafsson - bass. Friðrik Erlingsson - guitar. Ásgeir Bragason - drums.
Concert place: Menntaskólinn við Hamrahlið and rehearsal place.
Q4U: Berglind G. Garðarsdóttir - vocals. Elínborg Halldórsdóttir - vocals. Gunnþór Sigurðsson - bass. Steinþór Stefánsson - guitar. Kormákur Geirharðsson - drums.
Concert place: Rehearsal place and Hótel Borg.
Spilafífl:Sævar Sverrisson - vocals. Birgir Mogensen - bass. Örn Hjálmarsson - guitar. Halldór Lárusson - drums.
Concert place: NEFS club at University of Iceland.
Þeyr: Magnús Guðmundsson - vocals. Guðlaugur Kristinn Óttarsson - guitar. Þorsteinn Magnússon - guitar. Hilmar Örn Agnarsson - bass. Sigtryggur Baldursson - drums.
Concert place: Rehearsal place.
Bruni BB: Helgi Friðþjófsson - vocals. Ámundi Sigurðsson - vocals. Kristján E. Karlsson - vocals. Hörður Bragason - keyboards. Björn Roth - bass. Finnbogi Ásgeirsson - guitar. Sigurður Ingólfsson - guitar. Ómar Stefánsson - drums.
Concert place: Nýlistasafnið.
Bodies: Michael D. Pollock - guitar. Daniel Pollock - guitar. Magnús Stefánsson - drums. Rúnar Erlingsson - bass.
Concert place: Hótel Borg.
Grýlurnar: Ragnhildur Gísladóttir - vocals. Inga Rún Pálmadóttir - guitar. Linda Björk Hreiðarsdóttir - drums. Herdís Hallvarðsdóttir - bass.
Concert place: Óðal.
Sjálfsfróun: Bjarni Þ. Þórðarson - vocals, bass. Sigurður Ágústsson - guitar. Jónbjörn Valgeirsson - drums.
Concert place: Hafnarbíó.
Jonee Jonee: Þorvar Hafsteinsson - vocals. Bergsteinn Björgólfsson - bass. Heimir Barðason - drums.
Concert place: NEFS.
Fræbbblarnir: Valgarður Guðjónsson - vocals. Stefán K. Guðjónsson - drums. Steinþór Stefánsson - bass. Tryggvi Þór Tryggvason - guitar. Kristinn Steingrímsson - guitar.
Concert place: Fellahellir.
Mogo Homo: Óskar Þórisson - vocals, keyboards. Óðinn Guðbrandsson - bass.
Concert place: Bereft.

See also
1982 - Rokk í Reykjavík (Íslenska kvikmyndasamsteypan), the TV documentary.

References 

Post-punk albums by Icelandic artists
New wave albums by Icelandic artists
1982 soundtrack albums
Television soundtracks